Virginia State Route 209 may refer to
State Route 209 (Virginia 1928-1933)
State Route 209 (Virginia 1933-1948)
State Route 209 (Virginia 1957)
Virginia State Route 209, the present-day State Route 209 along Innovation Avenue in Loudoun County near Herndon.